Bevington can refer to:

People
 David Bevington, academic
 Dennis Bevington, politician
 Helen Bevington, poet
 Henry Bevington (1777–1850), English organ builder
 Stan Bevington, proprietor of Coach House Press, Toronto
 Terry Bevington, baseball manager

Places
 Bevington, Gloucestershire, a location in England
 Bevington, Iowa, United States